Reidar Kvaal MC (14 February 1916 – 17 June 2016) was a Norwegian military officer.

He was born in Stjørdal to farmer Ottar Kvaal and Guri Gjære.

During World War II he was a member of Kompani Linge. He led Operation Lapwing, a group of commandos who were paradropped in the mountains of Haltdalen in 1943 and operated within occupied territory.

He was decorated with the St. Olav's Medal with Oak Branch and the British Military Cross. He ended his military career as Lieutenant General in the Norwegian Army. He was decorated Commander of the Order of St. Olav in 1972.

References

1916 births
2016 deaths
People from Stjørdal
Norwegian Army personnel of World War II
Norwegian Army generals
Norwegian expatriates in the United Kingdom
Norwegian Special Operations Executive personnel
Recipients of the Military Cross
Recipients of the St. Olav's Medal with Oak Branch
Norwegian centenarians
Men centenarians